Ababacar Moustapha Lô (Abou Lô) (born 2 January 2000) is a Senegalese professional footballer who plays as a defender for Ligue 2 club Metz.

Career 
Lô was born in Dakar in Senegal. He began his career at Génération Foot before signing for Ligue 1 club Metz in 2019. He initially played with the reserve team in the 2019–20 season, winning the Group F of the Championnat National 3. In the 2020–21 season, Lô played for Belgian First Division B club Seraing on loan, making one appearance.

On 21 July 2021, Lô signed for Championnat National club Cholet on loan until the end of the 2021–22 season.

Honours 
Metz B
 Championnat National 3: 2019–20

References 

2000 births
Living people
Footballers from Dakar
Senegalese footballers
Association football defenders
Génération Foot players
FC Metz players
R.F.C. Seraing (1922) players
SO Cholet players
Championnat National 3 players
Challenger Pro League players
Championnat National players
Senegalese expatriate footballers
Expatriate footballers in France
Expatriate footballers in Belgium
Senegalese expatriate sportspeople in France
Senegalese expatriate sportspeople in Belgium